Walter Reisp (born 5 November 1910, date of death unknown) was an Austrian field handball player who competed in the 1936 Summer Olympics. He was part of the Austrian field handball team, which won the silver medal. He played two matches.

External links
Walter Reisp's profile at databaseOlympics.com
Walter Reisp's profile at Sports Reference.com

1910 births
Year of death missing
Austrian male handball players
Field handball players at the 1936 Summer Olympics
Olympic handball players of Austria
Olympic silver medalists for Austria
Olympic medalists in handball
Medalists at the 1936 Summer Olympics